Iridana unyoro is a butterfly in the family Lycaenidae. It is found in western Uganda and north-western Tanzania.

References

Butterflies described in 1964
Poritiinae